Dioxyna bidentis is a species of tephritid or fruit flies in the genus Dioxyna of the family Tephritidae.

Distribution
Europe, North Africa, Central Asia, Iran, China, Russia.

References

Tephritinae
Diptera of Europe
Insects described in 1830